Southington is an unincorporated community in central Southington Township, Trumbull County, Ohio, United States. It lies at the intersection of U.S. Route 422 with State Route 305 and has a post office with the ZIP code 44470. It is part of the Youngstown–Warren metropolitan area.

History
A post office called Southington has been in operation since 1826. The community takes its name from Southington Township.

Education
Children in Southington are served by the Southington Local School District. The district has one K-12 building south of Southington, administered as three separate schools:
 Southington Elementary School – grades K-5
 Southington Middle School – grades 6-8
 Chalker High School – grades 9-12

Notable people

 Mike Tyson, former professional boxer purchased and lived in a mansion in Southington during the 1990s

References

Unincorporated communities in Trumbull County, Ohio
1826 establishments in Ohio
Populated places established in 1826
Unincorporated communities in Ohio